Faggiano is a town and comune in the province of Taranto in the Apulia region of southeast Italy. Faggiano is member of the Unione dei Comuni di Montedoro, established in September 2002. Faggiano was historically an  Arbëreshë settlement. After the inhabitants abandoned the Albanian Greek Orthodox faith they assimilated into the local population.

Physical geography
The town is mainly located along a hill. The town is on the southern side of Monte Doro, a not so high hill part of Murgia and partially covered by a pinewood.

References

Cities and towns in Apulia
Localities of Salento
Arbëresh settlements